Lynda O'Connell (born 1981 in Cork) is a camogie player and an accountant, winner of All Ireland camogie medals in 2002 and 2005 and 2008 and 2009. She captained Cork to the National League Junior title in 2005 and is a holder of two Ashbourne Cup medals with UCC as well as Senior, Intermediate and Junior All-Ireland medals. Also holds Munster championship titles with Cork as well as a Senior county championship with her club and inter-provincial honours with Munster.

References

External links 
 Official Camogie Website
 Cronin's championship diary in On The Ball Official Camogie Magazine
 https://web.archive.org/web/20091228032101/http://www.rte.ie/sport/gaa/championship/gaa_fixtures_camogie_oduffycup.html Fixtures and results] for the 2009 O'Duffy Cup
 All-Ireland Senior Camogie Championship: Roll of Honour
 Video highlights of 2009 championship Part One and part two
 Video Highlights of 2009 All Ireland Senior Final
 Report of All Ireland final in Irish Times Independent and Examiner

1981 births
Living people
Cork camogie players
UCC camogie players